The siege of the Fortress of São Filipe, was a battle fought from 27 March 1641 to 4 March 1642 as part of the Portuguese Restoration War, near Angra, Azores, between Spanish and Portuguese over the control of the fort of São Filipe.

After 11 months of intense fighting the Portuguese were victorious and the Spanish garrison was defeated with very heavy losses.

References

Sources
Lourenço, Paula.Battles of Portuguese History - Defence of the Overseas. - Volume X. (2006)

São Filipe
Sao Filipe
São Filipe
São Filipe
São Filipe
São Filipe
1641 in Portugal
1641 in Spain
1642 in Spain